Thelma Adella Brown (born 1929) was a Pitcairnese politician. In 1973 she and Carol Christian were elected to the Island Council, becoming its first female members.

Biography
Brown was born Thelma Adella Christian in 1929, the daughter of  Flora Clarice Christian. She married Len Carlyle Brown, with whom she had five children between 1953 and 1959.

In 1973 she stood for election to the Island Council, and was elected unopposed, becoming one of the first female members of the Island Council alongside Carol Christian. She was re-elected every year until 1985, and then again in 1986.

Brown was featured on a set of Pitcairn stamps on weaving.

References

1929 births
Members of the Island Council of the Pitcairn Islands
Possibly living people